Elizabeth Ann Jolene Luciano Winsett (born October 31, 1949), known professionally as Liza Lorena, is a Philippine actress. She was a First Runner-Up in the Bb. Pilipinas pageant in 1966.

Career
Lorena was a flight stewardess (for PAL domestic flights), tourist guide and PTTA receptionist before she became first runner-up in the 1966 Binibining Pilipinas pageant to Maria Clarinda Soriano, who placed in the Top 15 of the 1966 Miss Universe contest. After her pageantry stint, she received movie offers from Dr. Jose Perez of Sampaguita Pictures, but Jose Nepomuceno won over her. She was chosen from among 64 candidates who read the lines of Esperanza for Because of a Flower (1967), topbilled by Charito Solis and Ric Rodrigo.

She won the FAP Best Supporting Actress award for her performance in Oro, Plata, Mata (1982). In 1986, she received the Best Supporting Actress award from Gawad Urian for the filmMiguelito: Batang Rebelde.

Lorena appeared in GMA's TV series Kung Mawawala Ka (2001-2003) with Sunshine Dizon, and in ABS-CBN's Maria Flordeluna (2007) starring Eliza Pineda. She also in the cast of ABS-CBN's Apoy sa Dagat premiered on February 11, 2013, which stars Angelica Panganiban, Diether Ocampo and Piolo Pascual.

As a veteran actress, Lorena appeared in more than 185 movies and television shows since 1967. The most notable movies she played in were May Bukas Pa (2009), Guns and Roses (2011) and Legacy (2012).

Personal life
Lorena was born in Pampanga on October 31, 1949. She is the mother of actor Tonton Gutierrez to former matinee idol Eddie Gutierrez. She gave birth to Tonton two years after she joined Bb. Pilpinas. Lorena has a daughter named Wednesday by businessman Honey Boy Palanca. She has a grandson, Wednesday's child Carlos Philippe, who won first place in the 2009 Kids Golf European Championships beating 30 other golfers from around the world, held in Scotland.

Awards and nominations

Filmography

Film

Zoom, Zoom, Superman! (1973)
Supergirl (1973)
Bagets (1984)
Tinik Sa Dibdib (1985)
May Minamahal (1993)
The Life of Rosa (2001)
Ikaw Lamang Hanggang Ngayon (2002)
Kailangan Kita (2002)
My First Romance (2003)
Kutob (2005)
Summer Heat (2006)
The Wedding Curse (2006)
Barang (2006)
Mother Nanny (2006)
Matakot Ka sa Karma (2006)
Sukob (2006)
Katas ng Saudi (2007)
Villa Estrella (2009)
Last Supper No. 3 (2009)
Maximus & Minimus (2009)
I Love You, Goodbye (2009)
The Red Shoes (2010)
Working Girls (2010)
Presa (2010)
Rosario (2010)
Captive (2012)
Thy Womb (2012)
Pagpag: Siyam na Buhay (2013)
Starting Over Again (2014)
Everyday I Love You (2015)
The Achy Breaky Hearts (2016)
The Day After Valentine's (2018)

Television series

References

External links

"Movie Celebrities Now And Then: Liza Lorena

1949 births
Living people
Binibining Pilipinas winners
Actresses from Pampanga
Filipino film actresses
Filipino television actresses
ABS-CBN personalities
GMA Network personalities